Kotalli (also Romanized as Kotallī) is a village in Tabar Rural District, Jolgeh Shoqan District, Jajrom County, North Khorasan Province, Iran. At the 2006 census, its population was 411, in 107 families.

References 

Populated places in Jajrom County